The 2017–18 EuroCup Basketball, also known as 7DAYS EuroCup for sponsorship reasons, season was the 16th season of Euroleague Basketball's secondary level professional club basketball tournament. It will be the tenth season since it was renamed from the ULEB Cup to the EuroCup, and the second season under the title sponsorship name of 7DAYS.

The 2018 EuroCup Finals were played between Darüşşafaka and Lokomotiv Kuban, and won by Darüşşafaka, which was their first EuroCup title. As the winners of the 2017–18 EuroCup Basketball, Darüşşafaka qualified for the European top-tier level 2018–19 EuroLeague season.

Format changes
For the 2017–18 season, the EuroCup went back to the initial format for the 2016–17 season which includes 24 teams playing in four regular season groups, with 16 teams advancing to the Top 16 phase, featuring four groups of four teams each. Eight teams will qualify for best-of-three quarterfinals, which will be followed by best-of-three semifinals and best-of-three finals.

Team allocation
A total of 24 teams from 12 countries participated in the 2017–18 EuroCup Basketball.

Distribution
The table below shows the default access list.

Teams
The labels in the parentheses show how each team qualified for the place of its starting round:
1st, 2nd, 3rd, etc.: League position after Playoffs
WC: Wild card

Notes

Round and draw dates
The schedule of the competition is as follows.

Draw
The draw was held on 6 July 2017, 13:30 CEST, at the Mediapro Auditorium in Barcelona. The 24 teams were drawn into four groups of six, with the restriction that teams from the same country could not be drawn against each other. For this purpose, Adriatic League worked as only one country. For the draw, the teams were seeded into six pots, in accordance with the Club Ranking, based on their performance in European competitions during a three-year period and the lowest possible position that any club from that league can occupy in the draw is calculated by adding the results of the worst performing team from each league.

Notes

 Indicates teams with points applying the minimum for the league they play.

Regular season

In each group, teams played against each other home-and-away in a round-robin format. The group winners, runners-up, third-placed teams and fourth-placed teams advanced to the Top 16, while the fifth-placed teams and sixth-placed teams were eliminated. The rounds were on 10–11 October, 17–18 October, 24–25 October, 31 October–1 November, 7–8 November, 14–15 November, 5–6 December, 12–13 December, 19–20 December and 26–27 December 2017.

Group A

Group B

Group C

Group D

Top 16
In each group, teams play against each other home-and-away in a round-robin format. The group winners and runners-up advanced to the Playoffs, while the third-placed teams and fourth-placed teams were eliminated. The rounds were on 2–3 January, 9–10 January, 16–17 January, 23–24 January, 30–31 January and 6–7 February 2018.

Group E

Group F

Group G

Group H

Playoffs

In the playoffs, teams played against each other must win two games to win the series. Thus, if one team wins two games before all three games have been played, the game that remains is omitted. The team that finished in the higher Top 16 place will play the first and the third (if it is necessary) legs of the series at home. The playoffs involves the eight teams which qualified as winners and runners-up of each of the four groups in the Top 16.

Bracket

Quarterfinals

Semifinals

Finals

Attendances

Awards

7DAYS EuroCup MVP

7DAYS EuroCup Finals MVP

All–7DAYS EuroCup Teams

Coach of the Year

Rising Star

Regular Season MVP

Top 16 MVP

Quarterfinals MVP

Semifinals MVP

MVP of the Round
Regular Season

Top 16

Quarterfinals

Semifinals

Finals

See also
2017–18 EuroLeague
2017–18 Basketball Champions League
2017–18 FIBA Europe Cup

References

External links
Official website

 
EuroCup Basketball seasons